Dozza is an Italian comune in the province of Bologna. Dozza is known for its festival of the painted wall, which takes place every two years in September. During this festival, famous national and international artists paint permanent works on the walls of the houses. A local landmark is Dozza Castle, whose cellars host Enoteca Regionale Emilia Romagna, the enoteca and wine bar dedicated to oenologic products of Emilia-Romagna.

History
Cardinal Campeggio was given the castle of Dozza while dealing with the 'Kings Great Matter'.

Culture

Museums
Museo della Rocca di Dozza
Museo parrocchiale di arte sacra

References

External links

The best villages of Italy
Photo Gallery about Dozza

Cities and towns in Emilia-Romagna